Falak Deh (also known as Falak Deh-e Pā’īn Maḩalleh) is a village in Lakan Rural District, in the Central District of Rasht County, Gilan Province, Iran. At the 2006 census, its population was 1,329, in 357 families.

References 

Populated places in Rasht County